Stella by Starlight is a live album by American saxophonist Dexter Gordon recorded at the Jazzhus Montmartre in Copenhagen, Denmark in 1966 by Danmarks Radio and released on the SteepleChase label in 2005. The album features Gordon's quartet with saxophonist Pony Poindexter.

Track listing 
 "Stella by Starlight" (Victor Young, Ned Washington) – 16:54
 Introduction – 0:10
 "Satin Doll" (Duke Ellington, Billy Strayhorn, Johnny Mercer) – 20:05
 Introduction – 0:15
 "Round About Midnight" (Thelonious Monk) – 10:33
 Introduction – 0:17
 "Sonnymoon for Two"  [fade-out] (Sonny Rollins) – 0:37

Personnel 
Dexter Gordon – tenor saxophone
Pony Poindexter – alto saxophone, vocals
Kenny Drew – piano
Niels-Henning Ørsted Pedersen – bass
Makaya Ntshoko – drums

Source:

References 

SteepleChase Records live albums
Dexter Gordon live albums
2005 live albums
Albums recorded at Jazzhus Montmartre